Alfredo Martínez may refer to:
 Alfredo Martínez (baseball)
 Alfredo Martínez (politician)
 Alfredo Martinez (art patron)
 Alfredo Martínez Moreno, Salvadoran diplomat, lawyer and jurist
 Fred Martinez, Belizean politician and diplomat

See also
 Alfredo Ramos Martínez, painter, muralist, and educator